Mata'afa Faumuina Fiame Mulinu'u I (1889 — 27 March 1948) was a high chief of Samoa and a leader of the country's pro-independence Mau movement during the 1920's and 1930's. He was the holder of high-ranking ali'i chiefly titles: the Tama-a-'aiga Mata'afa, Fiame from Lotofaga and Faumuina from Lepea.

Mau Movement

Faumuina initially cooperated with the New Zealand colonial administration, remodelling his village of Lepea along the "model village" lines demanded by Administrator George Spafford Richardson. In late 1926 he attended a meeting with Olaf Frederick Nelson and other independence activists at the home of Samuel Meredith to plan the response to an inquiry into Samoan grievances. This led to the formation of the citizens committee, which became the Mau. Faumuina suggested that the committee hold public meetings to discuss their grievances, and was a prominent speaker at the first two, calling for lawful change. When he assisted in raising funds for the Mau to send a delegation to New Zealand, he was confined to his village for three months. He was subsequently banished to Apolima. He was later sent to Lotofaga on Upolu. In October 1927 he was allowed to return to Apia to give evidence before the royal commission.

Following the exile of Olaf Frederick Nelson and arrest of Tupua Tamasese Lealofi III Faumuina became the effective leader of the Mau. He was one of the leaders of the procession on Black Saturday, and attempted to hold back the crowd when the shooting started. He was lightly injured, with a bullet grazing his back. The death of Tamasese left Faumuina as the undisputed leader of the movement, and he was put on a wanted list for a speech he had given months before. He went into hiding with other Mau members, but emerged in March 1930 for peace talks with the colonial administration. Following the negotiations, he led 300 members of the Mau to Apia to surrender. Over the next five years Faumuina continued to lead the Mau and keep the peace.

Reconciliation
Following the election of the First Labour Government of New Zealand in the 1935 New Zealand general election New Zealand policy towards Samoa changed, and the ban on the Mau was lifted. Faumuina negotiated with the new government, and gained concessions towards self-government. In October 1936 he was appointed senior sergeant in the newly-formed native police force. later that month the newly elected Fono recommended that he be appointed to the Legislative Council. In January 1937 he was appointed supervisor of native police. Eventually he rose to the rank of inspector.

In March 1939, he succeeded Mata'afa Salanoa Muliufi as Mata'afa following a hearing by the Samoan Land and Titles Commission. This was the first time the Mata'afa title passed from the elder line of Faasuamale'aui to the younger line of Silupevailei, which held the title until it was passed back following the death of his son and successor in 1975.

In February 1944 he was appointed to the position of Fautua, one of three advisors to the Administrator.

He died at Apia Hospital on 27 March 1948 at the age of 58, and was subsequently given a state funeral.

Legacy 
His wife Fa'amusami, was the daughter of paramount chief Malietoa Laupepa. His son, Fiame Mata'afa Faumuina Mulinu'u II (1921–1975) became the first Prime Minister of Western Samoa at the country's independence from New Zealand colonial administration. His granddaughter, Fiame Naomi Mata'afa is a high-ranking chief Lotofaga, the head of Aiga Sā Levalasi and is the current Prime Minister of Samoa.

References

Samoan police officers
Samoan chiefs
1948 deaths
Samoan independence activists
1889 births
Mataʻafa family